New Brockton is a town in Coffee County, Alabama, United States. At the 2020 census, the population was 1,428. The community was named for Huey E. Brock, a settler who came to the region in 1871.

New Brockton is part of the Enterprise Micropolitan Statistical Area.

Geography
New Brockton is located east of the center of Coffee County at  (31.381138, -85.924339). The city of Enterprise is directly to the southeast.

U.S. Route 84 passes through the southern part of the town as a bypass, leading southeast  to Enterprise and west  to Elba, the county seat of Coffee County. Alabama State Route 122 runs through the center of town, leading northeast  to Alabama State Route 51 north of Enterprise.

Demographics

2010

At the 2010 census there were 1,146 people, 469 households, and 327 families living in the town. The racial makeup of the town was 70.1% White, 21.0% Black or African American, 5.5% Native American, 0.2% from other races, and 2.7% from two or more races. 2.5% of the population were Hispanic or Latino of any race.
Of the 469 households 27.3% had children under the age of 18 living with them, 50.3% were married couples living together, 15.6% had a female householder with no husband present, and 30.3% were non-families. 27.7% of households were one person and 10.9% were one person aged 65 or older. The average household size was 2.44 and the average family size was 2.97.

The age distribution was 23.2% under the age of 18, 8.5% from 18 to 24, 26.4% from 25 to 44, 26.8% from 45 to 64, and 15.2% 65 or older. The median age was 38.5 years. For every 100 females, there were 92.3 males. For every 100 females age 18 and over, there were 89.3 males.

The median household income was $33,125 and the median family income was $38,300. Males had a median income of $36,500 versus $18,594 for females.

2000
At the 2000 census there were 1,250 people, 465 households, and 336 families living in the town. The racial makeup of the town was 67.36% White, 26.64% Black or African American, 2.80% Native American, 0.24% from other races, and 2.96% from two or more races. 0.72% of the population were Hispanic or Latino of any race.
Of the 465 households 29.2% had children under the age of 18 living with them, 52.9% were married couples living together, 16.6% had a female householder with no husband present, and 27.7% were non-families. 26.0% of households were one person and 14.0% were one person aged 65 or older. The average household size was 2.46 and the average family size was 2.95.

The age distribution was 22.0% under the age of 18, 10.6% from 18 to 24, 26.6% from 25 to 44, 24.9% from 45 to 64, and 15.8% 65 or older. The median age was 38 years. For every 100 females, there were 101.6 males. For every 100 females age 18 and over, there were 103.1 males.

The median household income was $24,032 and the median family income was $26,914. Males had a median income of $26,711 versus $20,417 for females.

Notable people
John W. Brock, United States Navy officer who received the Navy Cross posthumously for his actions in combat during World War II
Jan Crouch, co-founder of Trinity Broadcasting Network
Don Helms, pedal steel guitar player in Hank Williams' Drifting Cowboys
Chester Higgins, Jr., photographer for The New York Times
Wayne Mixson, 39th Governor of Florida
Abdul Salaam, former defensive tackle for the New York Jets

References

External links
New Brockton High School

Towns in Coffee County, Alabama
Towns in Alabama
Enterprise–Ozark micropolitan area